Prejba River may refer to the following rivers in Romania:

 Prejba, a tributary of the Sadu in Sibiu County
 Prejba, a tributary of the Lotrioara in Sibiu County